Erik Seidenfaden may refer to:

 Erik Seidenfaden (ethnologist) (1881–1958), Danish ethnologist
 Erik Seidenfaden (journalist) (1910–1990), Danish journalist, father of Tøger Seidenfaden